The Padre Eterno (meaning "Eternal Father" in English) was a galleon of the Portuguese Navy, built in Rio de Janeiro, Colony of Brazil in the 17th century, at the order of Salvador Corrêa de Sá e Benevides for transportation of sugar and goods for the Companhia Geral do Comércio. She was later sold to the Portuguese Crown.

According to the periodical Mercurio Portuguez published in Lisbon between 1663 and 1667 by the State Secretary of the Kingdom Antonio de Sousa de Macedo, she was considered the biggest ship of her time. She was indeed bigger than the British HMS Sovereign of the Seas and the French Saint Philippe, but was of equal size of the Spanish La Salvadora, and smaller than the Swedish Kronan, and the French Soleil Royal. She arrived in Lisbon from her maiden voyage on 20 October 1665. She sank in the Indian Ocean a few years later.

The name of the international airport serving Rio de Janeiro, namely Rio de Janeiro/Galeão-Antonio Carlos Jobim International Airport has a reference to Galeão beach, located in the close vicinity of the original passenger terminal of the airport. The beach in turn got its name from the galleon, entirely built at this location.

References

Naval ships of Portugal
Ships of the line of the Portuguese Navy
1660s ships
Age of Sail ships of Portugal
Galleons
Maritime history of Portugal